Øgrim is a surname. Notable people with the surname include:

Otto Øgrim (1913–2006), Norwegian physicist
Tellef Øgrim (born 1958), Norwegian fretless guitarist, composer, and journalist
Tron Øgrim (1947–2007), Norwegian journalist, author, and politician

Norwegian-language surnames